Silloth Battery Extension railway station was the terminus of the Blitterlees Branch, which turned southwards off the Carlisle and Silloth Bay Railway's Silloth Branch a short distance east of  station. The larger railway ran from Carlisle, England. The Bitterlees Branch does not appear on standard railway maps, but it is clear on OS maps, though the station is not identifiable as such.

The station's sole purpose was to serve the naval gun testing battery, built by Armstrong Whitworth. Most trains to the site consisted of military supplies, the passenger station was built to carry battery personnel and visitors, including royalty on at least one occasion. In 1895 the Shalzada of Afghanistan and Suite observed naval firing, but was said to be especially impressed with the Maxim machine gun.

Trains to the station were run on an ad hoc basis, the station never appeared on public timetables.

The station opened in 1886 and closed in 1928 when the battery closed, its operations being moved south to Eskmeals, near .

See also
 List of closed railway stations in Britain

References

Sources

Further reading

External links
 The station on a navigable Edwardian OS map National Library of Scotland
 The station on the branch, with mileages Railway Codes
 The line with period photographs Holme St Cuthbert History Group
 The line and station Cumbrian Railways Association
 The convalescent home Its own website
 The station Rail Map Online

Disused railway stations in Cumbria
Former North British Railway stations
Railway stations in Great Britain opened in 1886
Railway stations in Great Britain closed in 1928
Silloth